The 1970 Boston Marathon took place on Monday, April 20, 1970. It marked the 74th time the event was organized. The race was won by Englishman Ron Hill in 2:10:30. He shattered the course record by more than 3 minutes set by Yoshiaki Unetani just the year before. Eamon O'Reilly of the United States finished second, just 42 seconds behind in 2:11:12, the second fastest time ever recorded for the event. Hill became the first runner ever to average below 5 minutes per mile (4:58.6/per mile) in the history of the Boston Marathon. His course record  would be broken 5 years later by Bill Rodgers who ran 2:09:55. 

Women were not officially allowed to enter until 1972, but their first-place results from 1966 through 1971 were later ratified by the Boston Athletic Association.

Results

Men

Women

References

Boston Marathon
Boston Marathon
Boston
Boston Marathon
Marathon
Boston Marathon